Tang Hualong (1874 – September 1, 1918) was the education minister from 1914 to 1915 and the interior minister in 1917 in the Republic of China.

Biography
Tang Hualong was born in 1874. A prominent member of the Progressive Party of China, Tang served in the government of Xu Shichang.  He was assassinated on September 1, 1918 in Victoria, British Columbia, Canada by a local Chinese barber named Wong Chun (1886–1918), who later killed himself.

References

1874 births
1918 deaths
Education Ministers of the Republic of China
Interior Ministers of the Republic of China
Progressive Party (China) politicians
Unity Party (China) politicians
Democratic Party (1912) politicians
1918 murders in Canada
Chinese people murdered abroad
Deaths by firearm in British Columbia